Cortical visual impairment (CVI) is a form of visual impairment that is caused by a brain problem rather than an eye problem. (The latter is sometimes termed "ocular visual impairment" when discussed in contrast to cortical visual impairment.) Some people have both CVI and a form of ocular visual impairment.

CVI is also sometimes known as cortical blindness, although most people with CVI are not totally blind.  The term neurological visual impairment (NVI) covers both CVI and total cortical blindness. Delayed visual maturation, another form of NVI, is similar to CVI, except the child's visual difficulties resolve in a few months.  Though the vision of a person with CVI may change, it rarely if ever becomes totally normal.

The major causes of CVI are as follows: asphyxia, hypoxia (a lack of sufficient oxygen in the body's blood cells), or ischemia (not enough blood supply to the brain), all of which may occur during the birth process; developmental brain defects; head injury; hydrocephalus (when the cerebrospinal fluid does not circulate properly around the brain, and collects in the head, putting pressure on the brain); a stroke involving the occipital lobe; and infections of the central nervous system, such as meningitis and encephalitis.

Visual and Behavioural Characteristics 
Visual and Behavioural Characteristics of CVI are individual and may include several (but not necessarily all) of the following:

 The person with CVI may exhibit what at first appears to be frequent variable changes in vision. However, it is the environment that impacts their visual function rather than their neurology or capacity for vision at that moment. A persons change in visual function when processing visual information in a complex environment, or trying to process a certain complex or unfamiliar visual target likely accounts for what looks like their visual ability changing from one day to the next, or from minute to minute. Feeling tired or unwell may also compound this challenge. For some people with CVI the complexity of the environment, including variables like the complexity and familiarity of the visual input, or processing various forms of secondary sensory input (for instance, sound or touch) may cause them to have difficulty using their vision to their full potential. The amount of sensory input an individual can tolerate without impacting function significantly may change throughout development and person to person. Managing fatigue may reduce fluctuations but does not eliminate them, however utilizing breaks and being well rested may help to increase resilience during these times. Addressing these changes may mean adapting strategies that work for the individual person. For example, When undertaking critical activities, people with CVI should be prepared for their vision to fluctuate, by taking precautions such as always carrying a white cane, if they use one, even if they don't always use it to the fullest. Another example is having very large print available, just in case it's needed (For example, consider the consequences of losing vision while giving a public speech). Other potential adaptations to improve visual function in higher environmental complexity may include strategies like clearing away excess clutter from a work spaces, or providing a plain background to view objects against, reducing noise levels, or other methods of monitoring and adapting for environmental complexity. 
 One eye may perform significantly worse than the other, and depth perception can be very limited (although not necessarily zero).
 The field of view may be severely limited.  The best vision might be in the centre (like tunnel vision) but more often it is at some other point, and it is difficult to tell what the person is really looking at.  Note that if the person also has a common ocular visual impairment such as nystagmus then this can also affect which part(s) of the visual field are best. (Sometimes there exists a certain gaze direction which minimises the nystagmus, called a "null point.")
 Even though the field of view may be very narrow indeed, it is often possible for the person to detect and track movement.  Movement is handled by the 'V5' part of the visual cortex, which may have escaped the damage.  Sometimes a moving object can be seen better than a stationary one; at other times the person can sense movement but cannot identify what is moving. (This can be annoying if the movement is prolonged, and to escape the annoyance the person may have to either gaze right at the movement or else obscure it.)  Sometimes it is possible for a person with CVI to see things while moving their gaze around that they didn't detect when stationary.  However, movement that is too fast can be hard to track; some people find that fast-moving objects "disappear."  Materials with reflective properties, which can simulate movement, may be easier for a person with CVI to see. However, too many reflections can be confusing (see cognitive overload).
 Some objects may be easier to see than others.  For example, the person may have difficulty recognising faces or facial expressions but have fewer problems with written materials.  This is presumably due to the different way that the brain processes different things.
 Colour and contrast are important.  The brain's colour processing is distributed in such a way that it is more difficult to damage, so people with CVI usually retain full perception of colour.  This can be used to advantage by colour-coding objects that might be hard to identify otherwise.  Sometimes yellow and red objects are easier to see, as long as this does not result in poor contrast between the object and the background.
 People with CVI strongly prefer a simplified view.  When dealing with text, for example, the person might prefer to see only a small amount of it at once.  People with CVI frequently hold text close to their eyes, both to make the text appear larger and to minimise the amount they must look at. This also ensures that important things such as letters are not completely hidden behind any scotomas (small defects in parts of the functioning visual field),  and reduces the chances of getting lost in the text.  However, the simplification of the view should not be done in such a way that it requires too rapid a movement to navigate around a large document, since too much motion can cause other problems (see above).
In viewing an array of objects, people with CVI can more easily see them if they only have to look at one or two at a time. People with CVI also see familiar objects more easily than new ones.  Placing objects against a plain background also makes them easier for the person with CVI to see.
 For the same reason (simplified view), the person may also dislike crowded rooms and other situations where their functioning is dependent on making sense of a lot of visual 'clutter'.
 Visual processing can take a lot of effort.  Often the person has to make a conscious choice about how to divide mental effort between making sense of visual data and performing other tasks.  For some people, maintaining eye contact is difficult, which can create problems in Western culture (for example, bonding can be difficult for some parents who have an infant with CVI, and lack of contact in an older child can cause others to regard him or her with suspicion).
It can also be difficult for some people with CVI to look at an object and reach for it at the same time.  Looking and reaching are sometimes accomplished as two separate acts: look, then look away and reach. 
 People with CVI can sometimes benefit from a form of blindsight, which manifests itself as a kind of awareness of one's surroundings that cannot consciously be explained (for example, the person correctly guesses what they should do in order to avoid an obstacle but does not actually see that obstacle).  However, this cannot be relied on to work all the time.  In contrast, some people with CVI exhibit spatial difficulties and may have trouble moving about in their environment.
 Approximately one third of people with CVI have some photophobia.  It can take longer than usual to adjust to large changes in light level, and flash photography can be painful.  On the other hand, CVI can also in some cases cause a desire to gaze compulsively at light sources, including such things as candle flames and fluorescent overhead lights. The use of good task lighting (especially low-temperature lamps which can be placed at very close range) is often beneficial.
 Although people (with or without CVI) generally assume that they see things as they really are, in reality the brain may be doing a certain amount of guessing and "filling in", which is why people sometimes think they see things that turn out on closer inspection not to be what they seemed. This can occur more frequently when a person has CVI. Hence, a person with CVI can look at an optical illusion or abstract picture and perceive something that is significantly different from what a person without CVI will perceive.

The presence of CVI does not necessarily mean that the person's brain is damaged in any other way, but it can often be accompanied by other neurological problems, the most common being epilepsy.

Diagnosis 

Diagnosing CVI is difficult. A diagnosis is usually made when visual performance is poor but it is not possible to explain this from an eye examination. Before CVI was widely known among professionals, some would conclude that the patient was faking their problems or had for some reason engaged in self-deception. However, there are now testing techniques that do not depend on the patient's words and actions, such as fMRI scanning, or the use of electrodes to detect responses to stimuli in both the retina and the brain. These can be used to verify that the problem is indeed due to a malfunction of the visual cortex and/or the posterior visual pathway.

See also
 Cortical blindness

References

Further reading 

 
 
 
 
 
 
 "Fact Sheet: Cortical Visual Impairment" by Mary Ann Demchak, Charmaine Rickard and Marty Elquist, published by The University of Nevada, Reno in the Nevada Dual Sensory Impairment Project 2002.

External links 
 CVI Now A CVI resource hub associated with Perkins School For the Blind
 Little Bear Sees A foundation providing families with information, tools and research which improves the lives of children with CVI
 PCVIS The Pediatric Cortical Visual Impairment Society is a nonprofit promoting research related to the improvement of vision care for children with CVI

Blindness
Brain disorders